The Brooklyn baseball club was formed in 1883 by real estate magnate and baseball enthusiast Charles Byrne who convinced his brother-in-law Joseph Doyle and casino operator Ferdinand Abell to start the team with him. Byrne set up a grandstand on fifth avenue and named it Washington Park in honor of George Washington. The team played in the minor Inter-State Association of Professional Baseball Clubs.

Doyle became the first manager of the team, which drew 6,000 fans to its first home game on May 12, 1883, against the Trenton team. (This was actually the second game the club played in Brooklyn; three days earlier, with Washington Park not yet ready, the Greys beat Harrisburg 7–1 at the Parade Ground. It was the only professional match ever held at the ground, with some 2,000 fans in attendance.) The team won the league title after the Camden Merritt club disbanded on July 20 and Brooklyn picked up some of its better players. The Grays were invited to join the American Association for the following season.

Season standings

Roster

External links 
1883 Brooklyn Grays season at Baseball Reference
Interstate Association roster

References

Los Angeles Dodgers seasons
Brooklyn
19th century in Brooklyn
Park Slope